The  Archdiocesan Shrine of Our Lady of Guidance, also known as Ermita Shrine or Ermita Church is a shrine located in the district of Ermita in the city of Manila, Philippines.

History 
The church began as a rustic shrine made of bamboo, nipa, and molave wood that was built to house the image of Our Lady of Guidance in the area where it was found in 1571 by Spanish soldiers under Miguel López de Legazpi. The shrine eventually became a chapel built in 1606 as house for the image and was called La Hermita ("The Chapel" or "Hermitage" in English).   The word also gave the name to the present district in Manila where the chapel is located.

The church was damaged many times due to earthquakes. In addition, the image had to be transferred to the Manila Cathedral for safekeeping during the British occupation of Manila in 1762–1764. A more permanent stone church was built in 1810; the image was returned to the church in 1918.

In 1945 near the end of World War II, the church was reduced to rubble during the Battle of Manila. However, the image was saved from destruction and was temporarily kept in a private residence. Work began for the reconstruction of the church in 1947 with a new design by architect Carlos A. Santos-Viola. On March 28, 1949, attorney and future senator Jose W. Diokno married Carmen Icasiano at Ermita Church. Diokno was also baptized here on September 3, 1922, his godmother and second mother was Paz Wilson. By 1953, the reconstruction was completed and the image was returned to the new church.

On December 3, 2005, Manila Archbishop Most Rev. Gaudencio B. Cardinal Rosales,  elevated the status of this church to an archdiocesan shrine.

Gallery

References 

Roman Catholic churches in Manila
Buildings and structures in Ermita
1606 establishments in the Spanish Empire
Cultural Properties of the Philippines in Metro Manila
Churches in the Roman Catholic Archdiocese of Manila